This article represents the structure of the Belgian Armed Forces as of May 2020:

Chief of Defence 
The Belgian Armed Forces are headed by the Chief of Defence with the rank of General, who is assisted by a Vice-Chief of Staff and three Assistant Chief of Staff (ACOS) with the rank of Lieutenant General. Six general directorates headed by Major Generals manage the bureaucratic aspects of the Belgian Armed Forces.

 Chief of Defence
 Vice-Chief of Defence
 Policy & Governance Support Cluster (Gv Spt)
 Staff Department Strategy (ACOS Strat)
 Staff Department Operations and Training (ACOS Ops & Trg)
 Staff Department Intelligence and Security (ACOS IS)
 Defense Inspector General
 General Directorate Health & Well-being (DG H&WB)
 General Directorate Legal Support (DG Jur)
 General Directorate Strategic Communication (DG StratCom) 
 General Directorate Budget and Finances (DG BF) 
 General Directorate Material Resources (DG MR)
 General Directorate Human Resources (DG HR)
 Land Component
 Air Component
 Maritime Component
 Medical Component

Land Component 
The Land Component is commanded by a Major general and has the following organization:

 Land Component Operational Command (COMOPSLAND), in Evere
 Land Component Competence Centre, in Leopoldsburg
 Competence Centre - Engineer Department, in Namur
 Competence Centre - Maneuver Department, in Stockem
 Military Police Group, in Evere
 Alpha Detachment, in Evere covers the province of Flemish Brabant and the city of Brussels
 Bravo Detachment, in Nivelles covers the provinces of Walloon Brabant, Hainaut and Namur
 Charlie Detachment, in Marche-en-Famenne covers the provinces of Liege and Luxembourg
 Delta Detachment, in Leopoldsburg covers the provinces of Limburg and Antwerp
 Echo Detachment, in Lombardsijde covers the provinces of West Flanders and East Flanders
 Explosive Removal and Destruction Service (DOVO-SEDEE), in Oud-Heverlee
 Movement Control Group, in Peutie
 Civil-Military Engagement Group, in Heverlee and Nieuwpoort (Civil-military co-operation & psychological warfare unit)
 29th Logistic Battalion, in Grobbendonk
 Field Accommodation Unit, at Beauvechain Air Base (a company-sized unit tasked with building military camps for out of area operations)
 Training Camp Elsenborn, in Bütgenbach
 Training Camp Lagland, in Arlon

Motorized Brigade 
The Motorized Brigade is the Belgian land formation assigned to NATO

 Motorized Brigade, in Leopoldsburg
 Headquarters and Services Company, carrying the traditions of the 8th/9th Regiment of the Line, in Leopoldsburg
 Jagers te Paard Battalion (ISTAR), in Heverlee
 Headquarters and Services Squadron, A and B squadrons with Pandur IB reconnaissance vehicles (will be replaced by EBRC Jaguar) and  Voltigeurs Platoons for dismounted reconnaissance, C Squadron with Elta SCB-2130A radars, D Squadron (Training)
 1st/3rd Lancers Battalion, in Marche-en-Famenne
 Headquarters and Services Company, 3x infantry companies with Piranha IIIC wheeled armoured fighting vehicles (will be replaced by VBMR Griffons)
 "Bevrijding" - 5th Line Battalion, in Leopoldsburg
 Headquarters and Services Company, 3x infantry companies with Piranha IIIC wheeled armoured fighting vehicles (will be replaced by VBMR Griffons)
 Chasseurs Ardennais Battalion, in Marche-en-Famenne
 Headquarters and Services Company, 3x infantry companies with Piranha IIIC wheeled armoured fighting vehicles (will be replaced by VBMR Griffons)
 Carabiniers "Prins Boudewijn" - Grenadiers Battalion, in Leopoldsburg
 Headquarters and Services Company, 3x infantry companies with Dingo 2 infantry mobility vehicles (will be replaced by VBMR Griffons)
 12th Line "Prince Léopold" - 13th Line Battalion, in Spa
 Headquarters and Services Company, 3x infantry companies with Dingo 2 infantry mobility vehicles (will be replaced by VBMR Griffons)
 Artillery Battalion, in Brasschaat
 Headquarters and Services Battery, Mortar Battery with 120mm mortars, Howitzer Battery with LG1 105mm howitzers (a third battery armed with 155mm howitzers will be raised)
 4th Engineer Battalion, in Amay
 Headquarters and Services Company, Light Combat Engineers Company, Combat Engineers Company, Construction Company, CBRN-defense Company
 11th Engineer Battalion, in Zwijndrecht
 Headquarters and Services Company, Light Combat Engineers Company, Combat Engineers Company, Construction Company
 4th Communication and Information Systems Group, in Marche-en-Famenne
 10th Communication and Information Systems Group, in Leopoldsburg
 4th Logistic Battalion, in Marche-en-Famenne
 18th Logistic Battalion, in Leopoldsburg
 Training Camp Beverlo, near Leopoldsburg
 Training Camp Marche, near Marche-en-Famenne

Special Operations Regiment 
The Special Operations Regiment combines the Belgian paratroopers, special operations and special forces units. All units of the regiment are airborne qualified.

 Special Operations Regiment, in Marche-en-Famenne
 Headquarters and Services Company, carrying the traditions of the 4th Commando Battalion in Marche-en-Famenne
 Special Forces Group, in Heverlee
 2nd Commando Battalion, in Flawinne with Dingo 2 infantry mobility vehicles (will be replaced by VBMR Griffons)
 Headquarters and Services Company, 12th, 13th, and 16th commando companies
 3rd Paratroopers Battalion, in Tielen with Lynx light multirole vehicles
 Headquarters and Services Company, 15th, 17th, and 21st paratrooper companies
 6th Communication and Information Systems Group, in Peutie
 Commando Training Centre, in Marche-les-Dames
 Paratroopers Training Centre, at Schaffen Air Base

Air Component 
The Air Component is commanded by a Major general and has the following organization:

 Air Component Operational Command (COMOPSAIR), in Evere
 Air Traffic Control Centre, in Semmerzake
 Control and Reporting Centre, at Beauvechain Air Base, reports to NATO's Integrated Air Defense System CAOC Uedem in Germany
 Air Component Competence Centre, at Beauvechain Air Base
 Basic Flying Training School, at Beauvechain Air Base
 5th Squadron, with SF.260D/M+ trainers
 9th Squadron, with SF.260D/M+ trainers
 Military Glider Centre, with L21B Super Cub and a variety of gliders
 Joint K-9 Unit, in Oud-Heverlee
 80th UAV Squadron, at Florennes Air Base with four MQ-9B SkyGuardian unmanned aerial vehicles
 Aviation Safety Directorate, at Beauvechain Air Base

1st Wing 
The 1st Wing operates all helicopters, with the exception of the NH90 NFH helicopters supporting the Maritime Component.

 1st Wing, at Beauvechain Air Base
 Flying Group
 15th Squadron (Operational Conversion and Training Unit), with AW109BA Hirundo helicopters
 17th Squadron, with AW109BA Hirundo helicopters
 18th Squadron, with NH90 TTH helicopters
 40th Squadron, at Koksijde Air Base with NH90 NFH helicopters (to move to Ostend Airport in 2023)
 Maintenance Group
 Defense and Support Group

2nd Tactical Wing 
The 2nd Tactical Wing is one of two Air Component fighter wings and operates F-16AM Falcon fighters, which will be replaced by F-35A Lightning II from 2023.

 2nd Tactical Wing, at Florennes Air Base
 Flying Group
 1st Squadron (Close air support and reconnaissance), with F-16AM Falcon
 350th Squadron (Air superiority), with F-16AM Falcon
 Maintenance Group
 Defense and Support Group

10th Tactical Wing 
The 10th Tactical Wing is one of two Air Component fighter wings and operates F-16AM/BM Falcon fighters, which will be replaced by F-35A Lightning II from 2023. As part of NATO's nuclear sharing the US Air Force's 701st Munitions Support Squadron, 52nd Fighter Wing stores B61 tactical nuclear weapons at Kleine Brogel for use with Belgian F-16AM Falcon.

 10th Tactical Wing, at Kleine Brogel Air Base
 Flying Group
 31st Squadron (Close air support and nuclear strike), with F-16AM Falcon
 349th Squadron (Air superiority), with F-16AM Falcon
 Operational Conversion Unit, with F-16BM Falcon
 Maintenance Group
 Defense and Support Group

15th Air Transport Wing 
15th Air Transport Wing operates the tactical and strategic airlift aircraft of the Belgian Armed Forces. Additionally it provides VIP transport services to the Belgian government.

 15th Air Transport Wing, at Melsbroek Air Base
 Flying Group
 20th Squadron (Tactical airlift), with C-130H Hercules planes (being replaced by 8 A400M Atlas in 2020-23) Two A400Ms are currently operable, one of which is owned and partially operated by the Luxembourg Air Force, but assigned to the 20th.
 21st Squadron (Strategic airlift), with Airbus A330 MRTT (in 2021), and two Falcon 7X aircraft.
 Training and Conversion Unit
 Maintenance Group
 Defense and Support Group

Meteo Wing 
The Meteo Wing provides meteorological services to the Belgian Armed Forces and operates 10 remotely operated weather stations across Belgium.

 Meteo Wing, at Beauvechain Air Base
 Military Meteorological Forecasting Centre
 Meteorological School
 Maintenance Workshop
 Meteorological Telecommunications Unit

Naval Component 
The Naval Component is commanded by a Divisional admiral. The Maritime Component's ships fall operationally under the joint Belgian-Dutch Maritime Headquarters Benelux in Den Helder, which is commanded by the Dutch Admiral Benelux. The commander of the Belgian Naval Component doubles as Deputy Admiral Benelux.

Maritime Headquarters Benelux 
 Maritime Headquarters Benelux, in Den Helder
 Operations Directorate
 Operational Support Directorate
  Maintenance - Royal Dutch Navy
  Maintenance - Marine Component

Naval Component Operational Command 
 Naval Component Operational Command (COMOPSMAR), in Zeebrugge 
 Naval Component Competence Centre, in Bruges 
 Naval Component Logistics Centre, in Zeebrugge
 Naval Base Zeebrugge, in Zeebrugge
 s F930 Leopold I, and F931 Louise-Marie
 s M916 Bellis, M917 Crocus, M921 Lobelia, M923 Narcis, and M924 Primula
 Patrol vessels P901 Castor and P902 Pollux
 Command and logistic support vessel A960 Godetia, oceanographic research vessel A962 Belgica, and schoolschip A958 Zenobe Gramme

Medical Component 
The Medical Component is commanded by a Major General and has the following organization:

 Medical Component Operational Command (COMOPSMED), in Evere
 Medical Component Competence Centre, in Neder-Over-Heembeek
 Queen Astrid Military Hospital, in Neder-Over-Heembeek
 14th Medical Battalion, in Peutie and Lombardsijde
 Headquarters and Services Company, 3x medical companies (one company supports the Air Component, one company supports the Naval Component, and one airborne qualified company supports the Special Operations Regiment)
 23rd Medical Battalion, in Leopoldsburg and Marche-en-Famenne
 Headquarters and Services Company, 3x medical companies (supporting the Motorized Brigade)
 5th Medical Supplies and Distribution Element, in Nivelles

Armed Forces structure graphic

Geographic distribution of operational units

References

External links
 Website of the Belgian Armed Forces (Dutch/French)

Belgian Armed Forces